Beugel or van der Beugel is a surname. Notable people with the surname include:

 Ernst van der Beugel (1918–2004), Dutch economist, businessman, and politician
 Jacob van der Beugel (1978), UK born, Dutch artist
 Ingeborg Beugel (1960), Dutch freelance correspondent

Dutch-language surnames